David Alexander Robertson BEM (born 17 October 1968) is a former Scottish football player and coach, who is currently the manager of Scottish League One club Peterhead. 

Robertson played as a left back for Aberdeen, Rangers, Leeds United, Montrose and represented Scotland. Since retiring as a player, he has managed Elgin City, Montrose, Phoenix FC and most recently I-League club Real Kashmir, before being appointed manager of Peterhead in November 2022.

Playing career
Robertson began playing football with Deeside Boys Club (now Banks O' Dee FC) before he started his football career by signing an "s" form with local club Aberdeen, where he won the Scottish Youth Cup alongside Joe Miller, Paul Wright and Stevie Gray. After becoming a first team regular aged 17, he won a Scottish League Cup winner's medal against Rangers in 1989 and a Scottish Cup winner's medal in 1990 against Celtic in a match which ended with a thrilling penalty shoot out (9–8, Robertson scoring his kick).

Robertson moved to Rangers for £970,000 in 1991. With the Ibrox club, he helped the club to the last six of their joint-record nine championship titles in a row, as well as adding three more Scottish Cups and three more League Cups to his collection. He only received one red card during his spell, for a brutal bodycheck on his friend Joe Miller in the opening minutes of the Old Firm 1992 Scottish Cup semi-final, which broke the Celtic winger's ribs (Miller played on, Rangers still won the match with ten men and Robertson appeared in the final after suspension). During his time at the Gers, he won three full international caps for Scotland.

After exactly 250 games for Rangers, Robertson signed for Leeds United in 1997 for £500,000, but recurring injury problems curtailed his spell in England and he played only 26 league matches in four years at Elland Road (all in the first season).

Robertson retired from football in 2001 but was back playing in 2002 when he was appointed player/assistant manager of Scottish Football League club Montrose. He scored his first and only goal for Montrose in a 3–2 defeat at Cowdenbeath in the Scottish League Cup. His playing career with Montrose was cut short, however, due to one of his Achilles tendons snapping during a match against Greenock Morton in the same year.

Coaching career
In September 2006, Robertson was appointed manager of Montrose but he resigned just four months later. He moved to Phoenix, Arizona and worked as a director of boy's coaching at the Sereno Soccer Club. Robertson was head coach of USL Pro club Phoenix FC in 2013.

Real Kashmir
In January 2017 Robertson was appointed as the head coach of Indian I-League 2nd Division side Real Kashmir. Under his tenure Real Kashmir won the promotion to Indian top flight football, thus becoming the first team from Kashmir to be promoted to the I-League. Robertson also signed his son Mason to play for the club. 

Robertson's management of Real Kashmir was featured in two documentaries made for BBC Scotland, Real Kashmir FC and Return to Real Kashmir FC, which won best documentary at Scottish BAFTAs, the UK Broadcast awards, and the European Sports Awards in Rotterdam where it additionally won the best director award for its director Greg Clark. He was awarded the British Empire Medal (BEM) in the 2021 Birthday Honours for services to the community in Kashmir and UK-India relations. He left the club in September, and was succeeded by Mehrajuddin Wadoo.

Peterhead 
On 29 November 2022, Robertson was named as the new manager of Scottish League One club Peterhead, marking his first managerial role in Scotland in 15 years.

Career statistics

International appearances

Managerial record

Honours

Player
Aberdeen
Scottish Cup: 1989–90
Scottish League Cup: 1989–90

Rangers
Scottish Premier Division (6): 1991–92, 1992–93, 1993–94, 1994–95, 1995–96, 1996–97
Scottish Cup: 1991–92, 1992–93, 1995–96
Scottish League Cup: 1992–93, 1993–94, 1996–97

Manager
Elgin City
North of Scotland Cup: 2003–04

Real Kashmir
I-League 2nd Division: 2017–18
IFA Shield: 2020, 2021

References

External links

Profile and stats at AFC Heritage Trust
David Robertson at Premier League
Profile at Post War English & Scottish Football League A-Z Players Transfer Database
Profile at Sporting-Heroes.net
Profile at Leeds United FC History

Living people
1968 births
Footballers from Aberdeen
Scottish footballers
Scotland international footballers
Scotland B international footballers
Scottish football managers
Aberdeen F.C. players
Banks O' Dee F.C. players
Elgin City F.C. managers
Rangers F.C. players
Leeds United F.C. players
Montrose F.C. players
Montrose F.C. managers
Premier League players
Scottish Football League players
Association football fullbacks
Scottish Football League representative players
Scotland under-21 international footballers
Scottish Football League managers
Scottish expatriate football managers
Expatriate soccer managers in the United States
Scottish expatriate sportspeople in the United States
Scottish expatriate sportspeople in India
Expatriate football managers in India
Real Kashmir FC managers
Peterhead F.C. managers
Scottish Professional Football League managers
Recipients of the British Empire Medal